Egon Scheiwiller (born 11 February 1937) is a former Swiss cyclist. He competed in the team pursuit at the 1960 Summer Olympics.

References

External links
 

1937 births
Living people
Swiss male cyclists
Olympic cyclists of Switzerland
Cyclists at the 1960 Summer Olympics
Sportspeople from the canton of St. Gallen